Aita is an Etruscan deity, equivalent to the Greek god Hades.

Aita may also refer to:

 Aita (Morocco), a Bedouin musical style
 Aita (river), a tributary of the Olt in Romania
 All India Tennis Association
 r/AmItheAsshole or AITA, a subreddit

People

Given name
 Aita Donostia, pen name of Jose Gonzalo Zulaika (1886–1956), Basque musicologist and composer
 Aita Gasparin (born 1994), Swiss biathlete
 Aita Ighodaro, British author
 Aita Shaposhnikova (born 1957), Yakut translator and critic

Surname
 Fiorella Aíta (born 1977), Peruvian volleyball player
 Kosuke Aita (born 1998), Japanese curler
 Vincenzo Aita (born 1948), Italian politician and a member of the European Parliament
 Zina Aita (1900–1967), Brazilian artist

See also
 
 Abisara aita, a butterfly species